Canaanite may refer to:

Canaan and Canaanite people, Semitic-speaking region and civilization in the Ancient Near East
Canaanite languages
Canaanite religion
Canaanites (movement), an early Israelite non-Zionist movement.

Language and nationality disambiguation pages